Carlos Denari (born 29 July 1954) is an Argentine rower. He competed in the men's coxless four event at the 1976 Summer Olympics.

References

1954 births
Living people
Argentine male rowers
Olympic rowers of Argentina
Rowers at the 1976 Summer Olympics
Place of birth missing (living people)
Pan American Games medalists in rowing
Pan American Games silver medalists for Argentina
Rowers at the 1975 Pan American Games